Pulivaal is a 2014 Tamil-language thriller film directed by G. Marimuthu who earlier directed Kannum Kannum, and produced by Sarath Kumar and Listin Stephen. The film stars Vimal, Prasanna, Oviya, Ananya, and Ineya. The film is a remake of the 2011 Malayalam film Chaappa Kurishu which itself was an adaptation of the 2009 South Korean movie Handphone. It started production in March 2013 and released on 7 February 2014.

Plot
The film revolves around two men who are poles apart in their lifestyle:

Initially, we see Kasi, a Madurai based youth who lives at Besant Nagar in Chennai with his colleague. He works in a supermarket and earns only 3500 per month. He is in love with Selvi, a young girl and also who works in the same supermarket as Kasi, and they always hangout together. He has a close friend Chokkalingam. Valliappan, their manager always ill-treats Kasi even though he is very good natured. 

Then, we get introduced to Karthik, a rich businessman who is in a relationship with his colleague Monica. Unknown to Monica, his fiancee Pavithra is in love with him. Karthik's phone contains a few sex videos with Monica, and it reaches Kasi during an argument between Karthik and Monica at a nearby highway motel, when she finds out that he is engaged to Pavithra. 

Kasi hides Karthik’s phone and uses Karthik to solve his problems with Valliappan. When Selvi finds out that Karthik's phone is with Kasi, she tells him to give it back otherwise, she would not talk with him forever. Kasi repents and tells Karthik that he will return the phone very soon. When Kasi tells about his location to Karthik, the phone's battery was dead. Kasi gives the phone to his friend CD Chandran, a mobile shop owner to charge it. He finds the sex videos and uploads them in YouTube and exposes them without Kasi's knowledge. When Karthik sees it, he thinks that Kasi has uploaded it and Karthik decides to seek revenge. Monica tries to commit suicide thinking that Karthik exposed their affair to the world, and she gets hospitalized. Kasi learns from his another friend that the videos have been uploaded in YouTube when he gave the phone to charge and Karthik is believing he uploaded it, hence Karthik will kill him. Karthik finds Kasi in the supermarket, and a chase occurs between them. Karthik beats Kasi very badly, and Kasi retaliates Karthik in frustration. Both get heavily injured, and Kasi reveals that he was not the one who posted the videos in YouTube. He goes to Chandran's shop with Karthik and they both thrash him to death.

Karthik goes to the hospital to meet Monica, and they both reconcile. She gets discharged from the hospital, and Karthik takes care of her. Kasi comes to meet him with Selvi with some fruits and medicines. Karthik gives his phone to Kasi and tells to keep it, as a heart-touching sign of treating a poor person with respect and affection.

Cast

 Vimal as Kasi
 Prasanna as Karthik
 Oviya as Monica
 Ananya as Selvi
 Ineya as Pavithra
 Soori as Chokku
 Swarnamalya as Bindhu
 Thambi Ramiah as Valliappan
 Prem as Gowtham
 Rekha Suresh as Pavithra's mother
 Niranjini Aggarwal
 Singamuthu as Cameo
 Mimicry Sethu as phone shop owner

Soundtrack
Music is composed by N. R. Raghunanthan.

 "Neelangaraiyil" – Karthik, Saindhavi (Lyrics: Vairamuthu)
 "Kichu Kichu" – Haricharan, Anitha
 "Naadu Naadu" – Madhu Balakrishnan
 "Netrum Party" – Tippu, Ranina Reddy
 "Vaazhkai Unnai" – Hariharasudhan

Release
The satellite rights of the film were sold to Sun TV.

Sify wrote, "somehow the wafer thin story of Puli Vaal and its making leaves you cold and detached. Everything looks too manipulative, and look and feel does not have a local nativity. The ending is also a tame affair". Behindwoods gave it 2 stars out of 5 and wrote, "director Marimuthu allows the plot play out like a game with lifeless thrills, and whenever he does manage to build suspense he breaks it down with narratives that are tangential to the story". Indiaglitz gave it 3 stars out of 5 and wrote, "But for a few minor glitches...Pulivaal is "a highly entertaining movie". Cinemalead's Siddarth Srinivas loathed the film, rating it 1.5 stars on 5. Baradwaj Rangan of the Hindu wrote "At the heart of Pulivaal, adapted from the Malayalam film Chaappa Kurishu, is the grim truth that we cannot control life, and that the things we do can sometimes spiral into disastrous consequences for innocents."

References

External links
 

Films shot in Kerala
Films shot in Karnataka
2010s adventure films
Indian comedy thriller films
2010s thriller films
Tamil remakes of Malayalam films
2010s Tamil-language films